The Ayers-Allen House is a historic home located at 16 Durham Avenue in the Borough of Metuchen in Middlesex County, New Jersey. It was added to the National Register of Historic Places on September 5, 1985, for its significance in architecture. The  building, also known as Allen House Tavern, for its previous function, was built by descendants of early settlers to Woodbridge Township and remained in the family for many generations.

History and description
The frame house was built , likely by Jonathan Ayers. The house and property remained in the ownership of the descendants of Obadiah Ayers and his wife Hannah Pike for 184 years. According to the nomination form, it is believed to be the oldest structure in the borough. It is located yards from the site of American Revolutionary War skirmishes. It is believed to have been a stop on the Underground Railroad and to be haunted.

See also
 National Register of Historic Places listings in Middlesex County, New Jersey
Homestead Farm at Oak Ridge
Battle of Short Hills
List of the oldest buildings in New Jersey

References

External links

Houses completed in 1740
Houses in Middlesex County, New Jersey
Houses on the National Register of Historic Places in New Jersey
Houses on the Underground Railroad
Metuchen, New Jersey
National Register of Historic Places in Middlesex County, New Jersey
New Jersey Register of Historic Places
1740 establishments in New Jersey